The San Diego East-West Christmas Classic was an annual series of two post-season college American football bowl games played at Balboa Stadium in San Diego, California, in 1921 and 1922.

Game results

See also
 List of college bowl games

References

Defunct college football bowls
American football in San Diego